Lista haraldusalis is a species of moth of the family Pyralidae. It was described by Francis Walker in 1859, and is known from Sarawak and Borneo in Malaysia.

References

Moths described in 1859
Epipaschiinae